Whangārei Heads is a locality and volcanic promontory on the northern side of the Whangārei Harbour in Northland, New Zealand.

The McDonald sandbank lies a few metres offshore at low tide. The promontory to the south of the settlement consists of a hill, Mount Aubrey, and a small gravel beach about 200 metres wide, Reotahi Bay.

Geology
The heads contain the remnants of a number of extinct volcanoes with the dominant rocks being andesite or dacite. They were formed between 16 to 22 million years ago during the early Miocene. They are part of a  stratovolcano that extended to the Hen and Chickens Islands.

History
Gilbert Mair purchased the entire peninsula - everything south of a line running from McLeod Bay to the Pacific Coast, about  – from the Māori chief Te Tao, in 1839. He intended to resell it to Captain Bernard, but the latter was lost with his ship. The chief Te Tirarau claimed compensation of three horses because his ancestor had had blood spilt on the land, but settled for two horses in 1844. The government review of the land purchase in 1844 awarded Mair only , but Mair had sold his interest in the land to Logan Campbell. Campbell pursued his claim to the remainder of the land.

A group of settlers from Nova Scotia, led by the Rev. Norman McLeod, settled at McLeod Bay in about 1855 although the ownership of the land had not been settled. In 1861, Campbell received the right to buy  at 10/- an acre, and was granted  which he sold to the Nova Scotians.

Demographics
Statistics New Zealand describes Whangārei Heads as a rural settlement. The settlement is part of the larger Bream Head statistical area.

Whangārei Heads had a population of 969 at the 2018 New Zealand census, an increase of 210 people (27.7%) since the 2013 census, and an increase of 246 people (34.0%) since the 2006 census. There were 408 households, comprising 492 males and 477 females, giving a sex ratio of 1.03 males per female, with 162 people (16.7%) aged under 15 years, 78 (8.0%) aged 15 to 29, 453 (46.7%) aged 30 to 64, and 276 (28.5%) aged 65 or older.

Ethnicities were 92.9% European/Pākehā, 11.5% Māori, 2.5% Pacific peoples, 2.2% Asian, and 2.2% other ethnicities. People may identify with more than one ethnicity.

Although some people chose not to answer the census's question about religious affiliation, 61.0% had no religion, 28.8% were Christian, 0.3% were Hindu, 0.3% were Buddhist and 2.5% had other religions.

Of those at least 15 years old, 210 (26.0%) people had a bachelor's or higher degree, and 105 (13.0%) people had no formal qualifications. 156 people (19.3%) earned over $70,000 compared to 17.2% nationally. The employment status of those at least 15 was that 321 (39.8%) people were employed full-time, 111 (13.8%) were part-time, and 24 (3.0%) were unemployed.

Bream Head statistical area

Bream Head had a population of 1,392 at the 2018 New Zealand census, an increase of 282 people (25.4%) since the 2013 census, and an increase of 330 people (31.1%) since the 2006 census. There were 570 households, comprising 699 males and 696 females, giving a sex ratio of 1.0 males per female. The median age was 51.9 years (compared with 37.4 years nationally), with 237 people (17.0%) aged under 15 years, 123 (8.8%) aged 15 to 29, 687 (49.4%) aged 30 to 64, and 348 (25.0%) aged 65 or older.

Ethnicities were 94.2% European/Pākehā, 12.7% Māori, 2.2% Pacific peoples, 2.2% Asian, and 1.7% other ethnicities. People may identify with more than one ethnicity.

The percentage of people born overseas was 24.6, compared with 27.1% nationally.

Although some people chose not to answer the census's question about religious affiliation, 63.4% had no religion, 27.2% were Christian, 0.2% were Hindu, 0.4% were Buddhist and 2.6% had other religions.

Of those at least 15 years old, 306 (26.5%) people had a bachelor's or higher degree, and 147 (12.7%) people had no formal qualifications. The median income was $31,000, compared with $31,800 nationally. 201 people (17.4%) earned over $70,000 compared to 17.2% nationally. The employment status of those at least 15 was that 477 (41.3%) people were employed full-time, 183 (15.8%) were part-time, and 36 (3.1%) were unemployed.

Education
Whangarei Heads School is a coeducational full primary (years 1–8) school with a roll of  students as of  The school was established in 1858, and is the second oldest school still in operation on its original site in the country.

References

External links
Whangarei Heads School
Scenic walks

Whangarei District
Headlands of the Northland Region
Populated places in the Northland Region